Armando Paredes (born June 23, 1984 in Guayaquil) is an Ecuadorian football player. He played center midfielder for Barcelona Sporting Club in the Ecuadorian Copa Pilsener 2007.

Paredes was transferred to Barcelona Sporting Club from Club Venezia on July 5, 2002, for an undisclosed amount. In 2008 he played for Club Sport Emelec. He was loaned to Olmedo for the 2009 season.

References

 

1984 births
Living people
Ecuadorian footballers
Ecuadorian expatriate footballers
Ecuador international footballers
Barcelona S.C. footballers
C.D. El Nacional footballers
C.S. Emelec footballers
C.D. Olmedo footballers
Association football midfielders